St. Matthew United Methodist High School is a high school in Liberia. It was founded in 1969 by The United Methodist Church in Liberia.

References

Schools in Liberia
Educational institutions established in 1969